The Journal of Medical Genetics is a monthly peer-reviewed medical journal covering all aspects of medical genetics, including reviews of and opinion on the latest developments. It was established in 1964 and is published by the BMJ Group. The editor-in-chief is Huw Dorkins (University of Oxford).

Abstracting and indexing
The journal is abstracted and indexed in the Science Citation Index, BIOSIS Previews, Index Medicus/MEDLINE, Current Contents, Scopus, Embase, and CINAHL. According to the Journal Citation Reports, the journal has a 2020 impact factor of 6.318.

References

External links

BMJ Group academic journals
Monthly journals
Publications established in 1964
English-language journals
Medical genetics journals